Italia Guitars is a musical instruments manufacturer company that produces retro-styled electric guitars and basses. The company was founded in 1998 with a line of guitars designed in England by luthier Trevor Wilkinson and manufactured in South Korea.

Description 
Most guitars are based on other guitars manufactured in the 1950s and 1960s. For example, the basic shape of the Maranello is based on a Swedish Hagström of the late 1950s. The Modena is based on an Italian Crucianelli from the early 1960s. The guitars have been used by many musicians, most notably Chris Rea who discovered them after recovering from pancreatitis and deciding to embrace blues. A chance trip to a local music store led him to discover Italia guitars. He found they so perfectly suited him that he bought four for recording and touring, saying "I've played the best guitar of my life on that guitar."

Models

Guitars

 Europa 
 Fiorano Standard, Corian
 Imola
 Jeffrey Foskett Signature JF6, JF12, JFQ
 Maranello Classic, Speedster, '61, '63, Semitone
 Mondial Classic, Deluxe, Sportser
 Modena Classic, Challenge, Revolution, Semitone, Sitar
 Modulo Tipo1, Tipo3
 Monza
 Rimini 6, 12, Twin double neck
 Torino

Basses

 Imola 4, 5, GP, GP5
 Maranello Classic, Cavo
 Modulo Tipo1, Tipo3
 Mondial Classic, Deluxe, Sportster
 Rimini 
 Torino

Artists 
Some artists that perform/have performed with Italia guitars are:

Lightspeed Champion
Eon Sinclair of Bedouin Soundclash
Chris Rea
Elliot Easton of The Cars
Ricky Phillips of The Babys, Bad English and Styx
Conrad Keely of ...And You Will Know Us by the Trail of Dead
Todd Rundgren
Jeff Cook of Alabama
Nicky Wire of Manic Street Preachers
 Kenny Olson of Kid Rock and Twisted Brown Trucker
Whitey Kirst of Iggy Pop
 Eddie Duffy of Simple Minds
Fernando Perdomo of Transendence and DC-3
Jason Ringenberg of Jason & the Scorchers
Boz Boorer of Adam Ant and Morrissey
Gary Day of Morrissey
Bo Ramsey of Lucinda Williams and Ani DiFranco
 Nicholas Andrew Sadler of Daughters
Simon Edwards or Billy Bragg
Anthony Drennan of The Corrs
Keith Duffy of The Corrs and Ronan Keating Band 
 Ronny North of North
 Joey Mazzola of Sponge
 Paul Duffy of Ronan Keating Band and Boyzone
 Ben Waugh of The Sillies
Goran Bregović
 Jarrad Nöir of Foreign Legion

In popular culture 
An Italia Mondial Classic guitar is featured prominently in the 2005 Japanese movie Linda Linda Linda performed by Yuu Kashii as Kei Tachibana. An Italia Mondial II "Woody" guitar was also played by Haruhi Suzumiya in the 2006 anime series The Melancholy of Haruhi Suzumiya.

References

External links
 Official website

South Korean companies established in 2000
Guitar manufacturing companies
Musical instrument manufacturing companies of South Korea
Manufacturing companies established in 2000